Dualism is the fourth studio album by Dutch metal band Textures. It was released on September 23, 2011 in Europe, South America and Asia, and was released in North America on September 27, all via Nuclear Blast records.

The first single from the album "Reaching Home" was released on 19 August worldwide. A music video was released simultaneously with the song. That same day, drummer Stef Broks released a video through SickDrummer.com of himself playing along to the entire new track titled "Singularity".

The album was produced by guitarist Jochem Jacobs and it was recorded in Split Second Sound Studio in Amsterdam, Netherlands. The artwork for the album was designed by former vocalist Eric Kalsbeek and bassist Remko Tielemans.

Track listing

Personnel
Textures
Daniel de Jongh – vocals
Jochem Jacobs – guitar, backing vocals
Bart "Bastærd" Hennephof – guitar, backing vocals
Remko Tielemans –  bass guitar
Stef Broks – drums
Uri Dijk – keyboards, samples
Production
Jochem Jacobs – recording, mixing, mastering
Eric Kalsbeek – artwork
 Remko Tielemans – artwork, layout

References 

Textures (band) albums
2011 albums
Nuclear Blast albums